Um Da-Woon (Hanja:嚴茶雲, ; born 27 July 1985) is a South Korean football player who was a defender for Changwon City FC in the National League of South Korea.

References
 N-League player search: 엄다운 

1985 births
Living people
Association football defenders
South Korean footballers
Sportspeople from Ulsan